Tony Yazbeck (March 14, 1979) is an American actor, singer, and dancer, best known for his work on the Broadway stage, including the  revival of On the Town, for which he received 2015 Tony Award and Outer Critics Circle Award nominations for lead actor in a musical. Yazbeck is also known for his principal roles on Broadway, including J.M. Barrie in the Broadway production of Finding Neverland, Tulsa in Gypsy starring Patti LuPone, Billy Flynn in Chicago, Phil Davis in White Christmas, Al Deluca in A Chorus Line and the original casts of Broadway's Never Gonna Dance and Oklahoma (2002 revival). In 2014 he appeared in a concert version of Kiss Me, Kate with the John Wilson Orchestra at the Royal Albert Hall, London as part of that season's Promenade Concerts. In 2020, Yazbeck originated a leading role in the musical Flying Over Sunset, directed by James Lapine. The production began in 2021 at the Vivian Beaumont Theatre. Production was delayed because of the COVID-19 shutdown of Broadway.

Yazbeck made his Broadway debut at the age of eleven playing a newsboy in the revival of Gypsy starring Tyne Daly. On television he was featured on NBC's Smash, and he appeared in the feature documentary Every Little Step about the casting process for the 2006 revival of A Chorus Line on Broadway. Yazbeck is on the board of the YOUNG/ARTS program of the National Foundation for Advancement in the Arts.

Personal life
Born in Riverside, California, he grew up in Pennsylvania and Florida before moving to New York. He attended University of Cincinnati College-Conservatory of Music and Point Park University.

On October 20, 2014, Yazbeck married Katie Huff, an actress, dancer, singer, and choreographer.

Yazbeck is of Lebanese descent through his father, and has German, Irish, Ukrainian and Romanian ancestry on his mother's side.

Broadway

Other theatre

Awards and nominations

References

External links
 
 
Tony Yazbeck Official Website
Tony Yazbeck at Broadway World.com 
http://www.theatermania.com/new-york/news/03-2008/loose-lips_13170.html

20th-century American male actors
20th-century American singers
21st-century American male actors
21st-century American singers
American male dancers
American male musical theatre actors
American male stage actors
American people of German descent
American people of Irish descent
American people of Lebanese descent
American people of Romanian descent
Living people
Dancers from California
Male actors from Riverside, California
Point Park University alumni
Singers from California
University of Cincinnati – College-Conservatory of Music alumni
20th-century American male singers
1979 births
21st-century American male singers